The discography of The Dandy Warhols, an American alternative rock band from Portland, Oregon, consists of eleven studio albums, five live albums, two compilation albums, six extended plays and twenty-eight singles.

Their biggest international hit "Bohemian Like You" was certified silver in the UK while also peaking at number five in Italy.

Albums

Studio albums

Live albums

Compilation albums

Extended plays

Singles

Promotional singles

Other appearances

Music videos

Notes

References

External links
 
 

 
Discographies of American artists
Rock music group discographies